The 2019 Arizona State Sun Devils baseball team represents Arizona State University in the 2019 NCAA Division I baseball season.  The Sun Devils played their home games at Phoenix Municipal Stadium, off campus in Phoenix, Arizona.  Tracy Smith is in his fifth season as the Arizona State Sun Devils baseball head coach.

Personnel

Roster

Schedule and results

! style="" | Regular Season (37–17)
|- valign="top"

|- align="center" bgcolor=#ddffdd
|Feb. 15 || vs. Notre Dame ||  || Phoenix Municipal Stadium • Phoenix, AZ || 10–1 || Marsh (1-0) || Sheehan (0-1) ||  ||  || 2,630 || 1-0 || - 
|- align="center" bgcolor=#ddffdd
|Feb. 16 || vs. Notre Dame ||  || Phoenix Municipal Stadium • Phoenix, AZ|| 20–7 || Burzell (1-0) || Kmet (0-1) ||  || ASU Live Stream  || 2,723 || 2-0 || - 
|- align="center" bgcolor=#ddffdd
|Feb. 17 || vs. Notre Dame ||  || Phoenix Municipal Stadium • Phoenix, AZ || 16–5 || Dabovich (1-0) || Junker (0-1) ||  || ASU Live Stream || 2,554 || 3-0 || -
|- align="center" bgcolor=#ddffdd
|Feb. 20 || vs. San Diego ||  || Phoenix Municipal Stadium • Phoenix, AZ || 12–2 || Montoya (1-0) || Dolak (0-1) ||  || ASU Live Stream || 1,624 || 4-0 || - 
|- align="center" bgcolor="#bbbbbb"
|Feb. 22 || vs. UC Davis ||  || Phoenix Municipal Stadium • Phoenix, AZ ||colspan=7| POSTPONED DUE TO WEATHER ||-
|- align="center" bgcolor="#ddffdd"
|Feb. 23 || vs. UC Davis ||  || Phoenix Municipal Stadium • Phoenix, AZ || 3–2 || Marsh (2-0) || Lyford (0-1) || Tolman (1)  || ASU Live Stream || 2078 || 5-0 || -
|- align="center" bgcolor="#ddffdd"
|Feb. 23 || vs. UC Davis ||  || Phoenix Municipal Stadium • Phoenix, AZ || 13–3 || Vander Kooi (1-0) || Hannah (1-1) ||  || ASU Live Stream || 2078 || 6-0 || -
|- align="center" bgcolor="#ddffdd"
|Feb. 24 || vs. UC Davis ||  || Phoenix Municipal Stadium • Phoenix, AZ || 17–2 || Dabovich (2-0) || Brown (1-1) ||  || ASU Live Stream || 1826 || 7-0 || -
|- align="center" bgcolor="#ddffdd"
|Feb. 26 || vs. Pepperdine || #24 || Phoenix Municipal Stadium • Phoenix, AZ || 4–3 || Corrigan (1-0) || Stoutland (0-1) || Burzell (1) || ASU Live Stream || 1776 || 8-0 || -
|-

|- align="center" bgcolor="#ddffdd"
|Mar. 1 || vs. Michigan State || #24 || Phoenix Municipal Stadium • Phoenix, AZ || 8–0 || Marsh (3-0) || Erla (1-2) ||  || ASU Live Steam || 2563 || 9-0 || -
|- align="center" bgcolor="#ddffdd"
|Mar. 2 || vs. Michigan State || #24 || Phoenix Municipal Stadium • Phoenix, AZ || 8–5 || Tolman (1-0) || Tyranski (0-2) ||  || ASU Live Stream || 2733 || 10-0 || -
|- align="center" bgcolor="#ddffdd"
|Mar. 3 || vs. Michigan State || #24 || Phoenix Municipal Stadium • Phoenix, AZ || 13–2 || Dabovich (3-0) || Diaz (0-2) ||  || ASU Live Stream || 2560 || 11-0 || -
|- align="center" bgcolor="#ddffdd"
|Mar. 5 || at. Cal State Fullerton || #17 || Goodwin Field • Fullerton, CA || 6–4 || Corrigan (2-0) || Luckham (1-1) ||  || ASU Live Stream || 1096 || 12-0 || -
|- align="center" bgcolor="#bbbbbb"
|Mar. 6 || at. Cal State Fullerton || #17 || Goodwin Field • Fullerton, CA ||colspan=7| CANCELLED DUE TO WEATHER || -
|- align="center" bgcolor="#ddffdd"
|Mar. 8 || vs. Xavier || #17 || Phoenix Municipal Stadium • Phoenix, AZ || 12–0 || Vander Kooi (2-0) || Zwack (1-1) ||  || ASU Live Stream || 2213 || 13-0 || -
|- align="center" bgcolor="#ddffdd"
|Mar. 9 || vs. Xavier || #17 || Phoenix Municipal Stadium • Phoenix, AZ || 8–3 || Marsh (4-0) || Lanoue (1-1) || || ASU Live Stream || 2558 || 14-0 || -
|- align="center" bgcolor="#ddffdd"
|Mar. 10 || vs. Xavier || #17 || Phoenix Municipal Stadium • Phoenix, AZ || 11-6 || Dabovich (3-0) || Grammes (1-3) ||  || ASU Live Stream || 2488 || 15-0 || -
|- align="center" bgcolor="#ddffdd"
|Mar. 13|| vs. New Mexico State || #9 || Phoenix Municipal Stadium • Phoenix, AZ || 7-3 || Tolman (2-0) || Dehn || Montoya (1) || ASU Live Stream || 2519 ||16-0|| -
|- align="center" bgcolor="#ddffdd"
|Mar. 15 || vs. Washington State Cougars || #9 || Phoenix Municipal Stadium • Phoenix, AZ || 6-0 || Marsh (5-0) || White ||  || ASU Live Stream || 3489 || 17-0 || 1-0
|- align="center" bgcolor="#ddffdd"
|Mar. 16 || vs. Washington State Cougars || #9 || Phoenix Municipal Stadium • Phoenix, AZ || 8-7 || Montoya (2-0) || Guerrero ||  || Pac-12 Network || 4079  ||18-0 || 2-0 
|- align="center" bgcolor="#ddffdd"
|Mar. 17 || vs. Washington State Cougars || #9 || Phoenix Municipal Stadium • Phoenix, AZ || 6-5 || Tolman (6-0)  || Mills ||  || Pac-12 Network  || 3303  || 19-0 || 3-0
|- align="center" bgcolor="#ddffdd"
|Mar. 20 || vs. California Baptist || #5 || Phoenix Municipal Stadium • Phoenix, AZ || 15-9 ||  Romero (1-0)  || Burica  ||  ||  ASU Live Stream || 2851 || 20-0 ||
|- align="center" bgcolor="#ddffdd"
|Mar. 22 || at. Oregon || #5 || PK Park • Eugene, OR || 12-9 ||Marsh  || Kafka ||  || Oregon Live Stream || 793  || 21-0 || 4-0
|- align="center" bgcolor="#ffdddd"
|Mar. 23 || at. Oregon || #5 || PK Park • Eugene, OR || 4-5  || Tellache || Corrigan ||  || Oregon Live Stream || 888 || 21-1 || 4-1
|- align="center" bgcolor="#ddffdd
|Mar. 24 || at. Oregon || #5 || PK Park • Eugene, OR || 7-3  || Romero || Walker  || Romero || Oregon Live Stream || 1150 || 22-1 || 5-1
|- align="center" bgcolor=#ddffdd
|Mar. 29 || vs. Arizona || #3 || Phoenix Municipal Stadium • Phoenix, AZ || 8–2 || Marsh || Labaut || Corrigan || ASU Live Stream  || 6059 || 23-1 || 6-1
|- align="center" bgcolor=#ddffdd
|Mar. 30 || vs. Arizona || #3 || Phoenix Municipal Stadium • Phoenix, AZ || 8–3 || Vander Kooi || Flanagan || Romero || ASU Live Stream || 5688 || 24-1 || 7-1
|- align="center" bgcolor=#ddffdd
|Mar. 31 || vs. Arizona || #3 || Phoenix Municipal Stadium • Phoenix, AZ || 17–16 || Remero || Weems ||  || ASU Live Stream || 4461 || 25-1 || 8-1
|-

|- align="center" bgcolor="ffdddd"
|Apr. 2 || vs. Long Beach State || #2 || Phoenix Municipal Stadium • Phoenix, AZ || 9–14 || Baayoun || Cacchione ||  || ASU Live Stream || 2525 || 25-2 || 8-1
|- align="center" bgcolor="ffdddd"
|Apr. 5 || at. USC || #2 || Dedeaux Field • Los Angeles, CA || 6–10 || Lunn || Marsh ||  || USC Live Stream || 493 || 25-3 || 8-2
|- align="center" bgcolor="ffdddd"
|Apr. 6 || at. USC || #2  || Dedeaux Field • Los Angeles, CA || 3–7 || Lambert || Vander Kooi ||  || USC Live Stream || 579 || 25-4 || 8-3
|- align="center" bgcolor="ddffdd"
|Apr. 7 || at. USC || #2 || Dedeaux Field • Los Angeles, CA || 11–8 || Corrigan || Hurt || Tolman || USC Live Stream || 611 || 26–4 || 9–3
|- align="center" bgcolor="ffdddd"
|Apr. 9 || at. UNLV || #9 || Earl Wilson Stadium • Paradise, NV || 10–9 || McCrystal || Romero ||  ||  || 666 || 26–5 || 9–3
|- align="center" bgcolor="ddffdd"
|Apr. 12 || vs. #5 Oregon State || #9 || Phoenix Municipal Stadium • Phoenix, AZ || 4–1 || Marsh || Eisert ||  || Pac-12 Plus Live Stream || 3410 || 27–5 || 10–3
|- align="center" bgcolor="ffdddd"
|Apr. 13 || vs. #5 Oregon State || #9 || Phoenix Municipal Stadium • Phoenix, AZ || 4–6 ||  Chamberlain || Corrigan || Mulholland || Pac-12 Plus Live Stream|| 4080 || 27–6 || 10–4
|- align="center" bgcolor="ffdddd"
|Apr. 14 || vs. #5 Oregon State || #9 || Phoenix Municipal Stadium • Phoenix, AZ || 3–4 || Gambrell || Romero || Verbung || Pac-12 Plus Live Stream || 3241 || 27–7 || 10–5
|- align="center" bgcolor="ddffdd"
|Apr. 16 || vs. Seattle || #12 || Phoenix Municipal Stadium • Phoenix, AZ || 12–5 || Lidd || Parisotto ||  || ASU Live Stream || 2002 || 28–7 || 10–5
|- align="center" bgcolor="ddffdd"
|Apr. 18 || at Utah || #12 || Smith's Ballpark • Salt Lake City, UT || 11–6 || Burzell || McCleve ||  || Utah Live Stream || 1546 || 29–7 || 11–5
|- align="center" bgcolor="ddffdd"
|Apr. 19 || at Utah || #12 || Smith's Ballpark • Salt Lake City, UT || 8–5 || Vander Kooi || Rebar  ||  || Utah Live Stream || 1872 || 30–7 || 12–5
|- align="center" bgcolor="ffdddd"
|Apr. 20 || at Utah || #12 || Smith's Ballpark • Salt Lake City, UT || 3–6 || Tedeschi || La Flam || McCleve || Utah Live Stream || 1848 || 30–8 || 12–6
|- align="center" bgcolor="ddffdd"
|Apr. 23 || vs. UNLV || #10 || Phoenix Municipal Stadium • Phoenix, AZ || 9–2 || Burzell || Balko ||  || ASU Live Stream || 2750 || 31–8 || 12–6 
|- align="center" bgcolor="ffdddd"
|Apr. 26 || at. Washington || #10 || Husky Ballpark • Seattle, WA || 6–10 || Micheles || Marsh || Emanuels || Washington Live Stream || 676 || 31–9 || 12–7
|- align="center" bgcolor="ffdddd"
|Apr. 27 || at. Washington || #10 || Husky Ballpark • Seattle, WA || 9–10 || Nierenberg || Corrigan ||  || Washington Live Stream || 1050 || 31–10 || 12–8
|- align="center" bgcolor="ddffdd"
|Apr. 28 || at. Washington || #10 || Husky Ballpark • Seattle, WA || 11–6 || Romero || Burgmann || Dabovich || Washington Live Stream || 857 || 32–10 || 13–8
|-

|- align="center" bgcolor="ffdddd"
|May 3 || vs. #1 UCLA || #12 || Phoenix Municipal Stadium • Phoenix, AZ || 2–3 || Garcia || Marsh || Powell || Pac-12 Networks || 3878 || 32–11 || 13–9
|- align="center" bgcolor="ffdddd"
|May 4 || vs. #1 UCLA || #12 || Phoenix Municipal Stadium • Phoenix, AZ || 3–18 || Ralston || Vander Kooi ||  || Pac-12 Networks || 2753 || 32–12 || 13–10
|- align="center" bgcolor="ddffdd"
|May 5 || vs. #1 UCLA || #12 || Phoenix Municipal Stadium • Phoenix, AZ || 8–7 || Burzell || Powell || Dabovich || Pac-12 Networks || 2901 || 33–12 || 14–10 
|- align="center" bgcolor="ddffdd"
|May 7 || at. Arizona || #17 || Hi Corbett Field • Tucson, AZ || 10–7 || Burzell || Vannelle || Dabovich || Pac-12 Networks || 3908 || 34–12 || 14–10
|- align="center" bgcolor="ddffdd"
|May 10 || at. Nebraska || #17 || Haymarket Park • Lincoln, NE || 15–6  || Marsh || Waldron ||  || BTN2Go || 5425 || 35–12 || 14–10
|- align="center" bgcolor="ffdddd"
|May 11 || at. Nebraska || #17 || Haymarket Park • Lincoln, NE || 1–2 || Fisher || Vander Kooi || Gomes || BTN2Go || 5403 || 35–13 || 14–10
|- align="center" bgcolor="ffdddd"
|May 12 || at. Nebraska || #17 || Haymarket Park • Lincoln, NE || 5–8 || Eddins || Tolman || Schanaman || BTN2Go || 5325 || 35–14 || 14–10 
|- align="center" bgcolor="ddffdd"
|May 17 || at. California || #19 || Evans Diamond • Berkeley, CA || 6–5 || Dabovich || Reyes || Corrigan || Pac-12 Networks || 789 || 36–14 || 15–10
|- align="center" bgcolor="ffdddd"
|May 18 || at. California || #19 || Evans Diamond • Berkeley, CA || 2–3 || Horn || Vander Kooi ||  || Pac-12 Networks || 1033 || 36–15 || 15–11 
|- align="center" bgcolor="bbbbbb"
|May 19 || at. California || #19 || Evans Diamond • Berkeley, CA || colspan=7| CANCELLED || - 
|- align="center" bgcolor="ddffdd"
|May 23 || vs. #3 Stanford || #20 || Phoenix Municipal Stadium • Phoenix, AZ || 6–5 || Montaya || Little ||  || Pac-12 Networks || 2681 || 37–15 || 16–11
|- align="center" bgcolor="ffdddd"
|May 24 || vs. #3 Stanford || #20 || Phoenix Municipal Stadium • Phoenix, AZ || 4–6 || Matthiessen || Corrigan || Grech || Pac-12 Networks || 3470 || 37–16 || 16–12
|- align="center" bgcolor="ffdddd"
|May 25 || vs. #3 Stanford || #20 || Phoenix Municipal Stadium • Phoenix, AZ || 2–3 || Palisch || Dabovich || Little || Pac-12 Networks || 2801 || 37–17 || 16–13
|-

! style="" | Post-Season
|-

|-bgcolor=ffdddd
| May 31 || (3) #28 Southern Mississippi || (2) #21 || Alex Box Stadium, Skip Bertman Field • Baton Rouge, LA || L 3–15 || Shepard || Marsh ||  || 9918 || 37–18 || 0–1
|-bgcolor=ddffdd
| June 1 || (4) Stony Brook || (2) #21 || Alex Box Stadium, Skip Bertman Field • Baton Rouge, LA || W 13–5 || Dabovich || Clarke ||  || 9757|| 38–18 || 1–1
|-bgcolor=ffdddd
| June 2 || (3) #28 Southern Mississippi || (2) #21|| Alex Box Stadium, Skip Bertman Field • Baton Rouge, LA || L 12–13 || Blaylock || Burzell || || 9956 || 38–19 || 1–2
|-

| Source:

Coaches

Rankings

2019 MLB draft

References

Arizona State Sun Devils baseball seasons
Arizona State Sun Devils
Arizona State Sun Devils baseball
Arizona State